Sven Robert Morgan Alling (born Persson; 8 June 1968) is a Swedish actor, screenwriter and film and theatre director.

Alling finished Malmö Theatre Academy 1990. He rose to fame in 1993 as co-host of children's television show Tippen. He participated in Stjärnorna på slottet in 2016.

Filmography
Sune i Grekland (2012)
 2009 – Hjälp!
 2008 – Oskyldigt dömd
 2007 – Hjälp!
Arn – The Knight Templar (2007)
Göta Kanal 2 – Kanalkampen (2006)
 2006 – LasseMajas detektivbyrå
Lögnens pris (2006)
 2006 – Kronprinsessan
 2005 – Lasermannen
 2005 – Bellman & Lovisa
 2005 – Lite som du
Tjenare kungen (2005)
Kogänget (2004)
 2004 – Höjdarna
Ramona (2003)
 2002 – Taurus
Anderssons älskarinna (2001)
Gossip (2000)
En dag i taget. Medicinberoende (1999)
Den vita lejoninnan (1996)
Torntuppen (1996)
Tippen (1994)

Theatre
2011 - Två herrars tjänare (The Royal Dramatic Theatre, Stockholm)
2007 - Maskerade (The Royal Swedish Opera, Stockholm)
2007 - Sultanens hemlighet (The Royal Dramatic Theatre, Stockholm)
2005 - Köpmannen i Venedig (The Royal Dramatic Theatre, Stockholm)
2004 - A Clockwork Orange (The Royal Dramatic Theatre, Stockholm)
2003 - Farmor och vår herre (The Royal Dramatic Theatre, Stockholm)
2003 - En Magisk Jul (The Royal Dramatic Theatre, Stockholm)
2003 - Romeo and Juliet (The Royal Dramatic Theatre, Stockholm)
2002 - Hustruskolan (The Royal Dramatic Theatre, Stockholm)
2001 - Skattkammarön (The Royal Dramatic Theatre, Stockholm)
2000 - Scapin (The Royal Dramatic Theatre, Stockholm)
1998 - Erik XIV (Teater Halland)
1996 - Hamlet -om vi hinner 2.0 (Teater Halland)
1996 - Kärleksbarn (Östgötateatern, Norrköping)
1996 - Paradisets barn (Malmö City Theatre)
1995 - Commedia
1994 - Clowner - En improvisation
1991 - Oliver (Studioteatern, Malmö)
1990 - Nicholas Nickleby (Göteborg City Theatre)

Music
1997 - Lasses och Morgans sopresa
1996 - Lasse och Morgans jul
1994 - Gänget från Tippen

External links
Morgan Allings officiella hemsida

1968 births
Living people
People from Mölndal
Swedish male actors
Swedish screenwriters
Swedish male screenwriters
Swedish film directors
Swedish theatre directors